The analyst's traveling salesman problem is an analog of the traveling salesman problem in combinatorial optimization. In its simplest and original form, it asks which plane sets are subsets of rectifiable curves of finite length. Whereas the original traveling salesman problem asks for the shortest way to visit every vertex in a finite set with a discrete path, this analytical version may require the curve to visit infinitely many points.

β-numbers
A rectifiable curve has tangents at almost all of its points, where in this case "almost all" means all but a subset whose one-dimensional Hausdorff measure is zero. Accordingly, if a set is contained in a rectifiable curve, the set must look flat when zooming in on almost all of its points. This suggests that testing us whether a set could be contained in a rectifiable curve must somehow incorporate information about how flat it is when one zooms in on its points at different scales.

This discussion motivates the definition of the following quantity, for a plane set : 

Intuitively,  is the width of the smallest rectangle containing the portion of  inside , and hence  gives a scale invariant notion of flatness.

Jones' traveling salesman theorem in R2

Let Δ denote the collection of dyadic squares, that is,

 

where  denotes the set of integers. For a set , define

Then Peter Jones's analyst's traveling salesman theorem may be stated as follows:

 There is a number C > 0 such that whenever E is a set with such that β(E) < ∞, E can be contained in a curve with length no more than Cβ(E).
 Conversely (and substantially more difficult to prove), if Γ is a rectifiable curve, then β(Γ) < CH1(Γ).

Generalizations and Menger curvature

Euclidean space and Hilbert space
The Traveling Salesman Theorem was shown to hold in general Euclidean spaces by Kate Okikiolu, that is, the same theorem above holds for sets , d > 1, where Δ is now the collection of dyadic cubes in  defined in a similar way as dyadic squares. In her proof, the constant C grows exponentially with the dimension d.

With some slight modifications to the definition of β(E), Raanan Schul showed Traveling Salesman Theorem also holds for sets E that lie in any Hilbert Space, and in particular, implies the theorems of Jones and Okikiolu, where now the constant C is independent of dimension. (In particular, this involves using β-numbers of balls instead of cubes).

Menger curvature and metric spaces
Hahlomaa further adjusted the definition of β(E) to get a condition for when a set E of an arbitrary metric space may be contained in the Lipschitz-image of a subset  of positive measure. For this, he had to redefine the definition of the β-numbers using menger curvature (since in a metric space there isn't necessarily a notion of a cube or a straight line).

Menger curvature, as in the previous example, can be used to give numerical estimates that determine whether a set contains a rectifiable subset, and the proofs of these results frequently depend on β-numbers.

Denjoy–Riesz theorem 
The Denjoy–Riesz theorem gives general conditions under which a point set can be covered by the homeomorphic image of a curve. This is true, in particular, for every compact totally disconnected subset of the Euclidean plane. However, it may be necessary for such an arc to have infinite length, failing to meet the conditions of the analyst's traveling salesman theorem.

References

Harmonic analysis
Real analysis
Geometry
Theorems in discrete mathematics